Wilfrid Edouard Beaudry (1891-19??) was a French-Canadian composer of two-steps and waltzes from the ragtime era.

He was born and lived in Quebec.

His published works include

 1904 - The Yankee in Quebec - two-step
 1904 - Violettes
 1904 - Nouhika - Indian intermezzo two-step 
 1905 - Hakama, a Japanese Jingle 
 1905 - Valse Des Amours
 1906 - Laval: Valse - dedicated to the students at Laval University and the University of Montreal.
 1908 - Clodia
 1909 - 1909 pas de deux
 1910 - Carnaval
 1927 - J'ai connu le secret du bonheur

References

Canadian composers
Canadian male composers
Canadian songwriters
Musicians from Quebec
1891 births
Year of death missing